Gergely Fűzfa (born 18 July 1988 in Budapest) is a Hungarian retired footballer.

References 
Profile at HLSZ 

1988 births
Living people
Footballers from Budapest
Hungarian footballers
Hungarian expatriate footballers
Association football midfielders
Budafoki LC footballers
Újpest FC players
Lombard-Pápa TFC footballers
DSV Leoben players
Expatriate footballers in Austria
SK Vorwärts Steyr players